Tobler's hiking function is an exponential function determining the hiking speed, taking into account the slope angle. It was formulated by Waldo Tobler. This function was estimated from empirical data of Eduard Imhof.

Formula
Walking velocity:

 

 

where

 W = walking velocity [km/h]
 dh = elevation difference,
 dx = distance,
 S = slope,
 θ = angle of slope (inclination).

The velocity on the flat terrain is 5 km / h, the maximum speed of 6 km / h is achieved roughly at -2.86°.

On flat terrain this formula works out to 5 km/h. For off-path travel, this value should be multiplied by 3/5, for horseback by 5/4.

Pace 
Pace is the reciprocal of speed. For Tobler's hiking function it can be calculated from the following conversion:

 

where

 p = pace [s/m]
 m = gradient uphill or downhill (dh/dx = S in Tobler's formula),

Sample values

See also
Naismith's rule
Preferred walking speed

References 

Hiking